is a Japanese classical pianist and conductor. In 2021, he won second prize, ex aequo, at the XVIII International Chopin Piano Competition, the highest prize for a Japanese-born pianist in the competition since Mitsuko Uchida's second prize in 1970.

Biography 
Sorita currently studies under Piotr Paleczny at the Chopin University of Music in Warsaw. He previously studied with Mikhail Voskresensky at the Moscow Conservatory. He has appeared as soloist with such orchestras as the Deutsches Symphonie-Orchester Berlin, Mariinsky Theatre Orchestra, RAI National Symphony Orchestra, NHK Symphony Orchestra, Warsaw National Philharmonic Orchestra, and on a five-city Japanese tour with the Russian National Orchestra. He has recorded for such labels as Denon Records.

In 2019, he founded the MLM National Orchestra. Known today as the Japan National Orchestra, it is a 17-member chamber orchestra.

On January 1, 2023, he announced his marriage to Aimi Kobayashi, a fellow laureate of the Chopin Competition, as well as Kobayashi's pregnancy. The two have known each other since childhood.

References

External links 
 

1994 births
21st-century classical musicians
21st-century classical pianists
Japanese classical pianists
Japanese male classical pianists
Living people
Musicians from Tokyo
Prize-winners of the International Chopin Piano Competition